General Amusement Corporation (GAC) was an international talent booking agency that was acquired by ICM Partners in 1974. In the 1940s, GAC's name was changed to General Artists Corporation to avoid confusion with a registered coin-machine company. General Artists Corporation, through a series of acquisitions and mergers, evolved first into a larger agency called Creative Management Associates, and then, in 1974, into ICM Partners.

GAC was founded in the early 1930s as a partnership between Thomas G. Rockwell (–1958) and Francis "Cork" O'Keefe (1900–1990). It was called the Rockwell-O'Keefe Theatrical Agency. Their clients, then, included Bing Crosby and the newly formed Dorsey Brothers band.  In 1939, when O'Keefe retired, Rockwell reorganized the firm and changed the name to General Amusement Corporation. In the 1940s, the only larger booking firm was Music Corporation of America (MCA).

References 

Companies based in Los Angeles
Talent and literary agencies
Companies established in the 1930s